Masabata Marie Klaas (alternatively Mazabatha Klaas, born 3 February 1991) is a South African cricketer who plays as a right-arm medium bowler. She made her debut for South Africa in 2010.

In March 2018, she was one of fourteen players to be awarded a national contract by Cricket South Africa ahead of the 2018–19 season. In October 2018, she was named in South Africa's squad for the 2018 ICC Women's World Twenty20 tournament in the West Indies.

In May 2019, in the second WODI against Pakistan, Klass became the tenth bowler to take a hat-trick in a WODI match.

In September 2019, she was named in the Terblanche XI squad for the inaugural edition of the Women's T20 Super League in South Africa. In January 2020, she was named in South Africa's squad for the 2020 ICC Women's T20 World Cup in Australia. On 23 July 2020, Klaas was named in South Africa's 24-woman squad to begin training in Pretoria, ahead of their tour to England.

In February 2022, she was named in South Africa's team for the 2022 Women's Cricket World Cup in New Zealand. In July 2022, she was named in South Africa's team for the cricket tournament at the 2022 Commonwealth Games in Birmingham, England.

References

External links
 
 

1991 births
Living people
Cricketers from Free State (province)
South African women cricketers
South Africa women One Day International cricketers
South Africa women Twenty20 International cricketers
Free State women cricketers
North West women cricketers
Cricketers at the 2022 Commonwealth Games
Commonwealth Games competitors for South Africa
20th-century South African women
21st-century South African women